

Great Britain
 Georgia – James Wright, Governor of Georgia (1760–1776)
 Gibraltar – Edward Cornwallis, Governor of Gibraltar (1761–1776)
 Province of New Jersey – William Franklin, Governor of New Jersey (1763–1776)

Portugal
 Angola – Francisco Inocéncio de Sousa Coutinho, Governor of Angola (1764–1772)
 Macau –
 D. Rodrigo de Castro, Governor of Macau (1770–1771)
 Diogo Fernandes Salema e Saldanha, Governor of Macau (1771–1777)

Spain
New Spain – 
Carlos Francisco de Croix, marqués de Croix, Viceroy of New Spain (1766–1771)
Antonio María de Bucareli y Ursúa, Viceroy of New Spain (1771–1779)

Colonial governors
Colonial governors
1771